The PING/Welch's Championship was an annual golf tournament for professional female golfers on the LPGA Tour. Founded in 1980 as the Boston Five Classic, it took place every year in the Greater Boston area from 1980 through 1997. It was played at the Ferncroft Country Club in Danvers from 1980 to 1990 and at the Blue Hill Country Club in Canton from 1991 to 1997.

The tournament has had a variety of sponsors during its history. Its last title sponsors were Ping, a brand of golf equipment and Welch's, a North American producer of fruit juices. 

Tournament names through the years: 
1980-1990: Boston Five Classic
1991: LPGA Bay State Classic
1992: Welch's Classic
1993-1996: PING/Welch's Championship
1997: Welch's Championship

Winners

External links
LPGA official website
Ferncroft Country Club

1980 establishments in Massachusetts
1997 disestablishments in Massachusetts
Canton, Massachusetts
Danvers, Massachusetts
Former LPGA Tour events
Golf in Massachusetts
Events in Essex County, Massachusetts
Events in Norfolk County, Massachusetts
Recurring sporting events established in 1980
Recurring sporting events established in 1997
Sports competitions in Massachusetts
Sports in Essex County, Massachusetts
Sports in Norfolk County, Massachusetts
Tourist attractions in Essex County, Massachusetts
Tourist attractions in Norfolk County, Massachusetts
History of women in Massachusetts